Jean Rescues is a 1911 silent film short directed by Laurence Trimble, starring Florence Turner and Trimble's dog Jean. It was produced by the Vitagraph Company of America and distributed through the General Film Company. This film survives in 35mm in the Library of Congress.

Cast
Florence Turner — Alice
Leo Delaney — Horace
William J. Humphrey — Oscar
Jean — Jean, a dog

References

External links

1911 short films
1911 films
American black-and-white films
Films directed by Laurence Trimble
Vitagraph Studios short films
1910s American films